Nagilla is a large village which is located in Madgul mandal of Ranga Reddy district, Telangana, India.

Population 

Villages in Ranga Reddy district